= Phillip J. Barrish =

American historian

Phillip J. Barrish is an American literary scholar, currently the Tony Hilfer Professor of American and British Literature at University of Texas at Austin, and also a published author.

== Education ==
- Cornell University, Ph.D. in English and American Literature, 1991
- Cornell University, M.A. in English and American Literature, 1987
- The University of Pennsylvania, Simultaneous M.A. in English and B.A., Magna Cum Laude, with Honors in English, 1985
